The legal status of the Holy See, the ecclesiastical jurisdiction of the Catholic Church in Rome, both in state practice and according to the writing of modern legal scholars, is that of a full subject of public international law, with rights and duties analogous to those of states.

A sui generis entity possessing international personality
Although the Holy See, as distinct from the Vatican City State, does not fulfill the long-established criteria in international law of statehood; i.e. having a permanent population, a defined territory, a stable government and the capacity to enter into relations with other states; its possession of full legal personality in international law is evidenced by its diplomatic relations with 180 states, that it is a member-state in various intergovernmental international organizations, and that it is: "respected by the international community of sovereign States and treated as a subject of international law having the capacity to engage in diplomatic relations and to enter into binding agreements with one, several, or many states under international law that are largely geared to establish and preserving peace in the world." As Graham notes:

This peculiar character of the Holy See in international law, as a non-territorial entity with a legal personality akin to that of states, has led Prof. Ian Brownlie to define it as a "sui generis entity". Prof. Maurice Mendelson (then lecturer) argued that "[i]n two respects it may be doubted whether the territorial entity, the Vatican City, meets the traditional criteria of statehood" and that "[t]he special status of the Vatican City is probably best regarded as a means of ensuring that the Pope can freely exercise his spiritual functions, and in this respect is loosely analogous to that of the headquarters of international organisations."

Self-perception of the Holy See
Moreover, the Holy See itself, while claiming international legal personality, does not claim to be a State. Cardinal Jean-Louis Tauran, former Secretary for Relations with States of the Secretariat of State of the Holy See, has underlined the need to avoid assimilating the Holy See and its international action with that of a State, with their thirst for power.  According to Tauran, the Holy See is unquestionably a sovereign subject of international law but of a predominantly religious nature.

The legal basis of the Holy See's international personality

For some experts, the current legal personality of the Holy See is a remnant of its preeminent role in medieval politics. Thus Arangio-Ruiz noted that the Holy See has been an actor in the evolution of international law since before the creation of strong nation states, and that it has maintained international personality since. 
 
For others, the international personality of the Holy See arises solely from its recognition by other states.  In this sense, Brownlie argues that the personality of the Holy See “as a religious organ apart from its territorial base in the Vatican City” arises from the "principle of effectiveness", that is, from the fact that other states voluntarily recognize the Holy See, acquiesce having bilateral relations with it, and in fact do so, in a situation where no rule of ius cogens is breached.  For him, though, the international personality thus conferred is effective only towards those states prepared to enter into diplomatic relations with it. Crawford similarly believes that the recognition of a number of states is important evidence to acknowledge the legal personality of the Holy See, so that, today, it cannot be denied.

For a third group of authors, the international legal personality of the Holy See is based mostly, but not only, on its unique spiritual role. Araujo notes, for instance, that "it is generally understood that the Holy See’s international personality emerges from its religious, moral and spiritual authority and mission in the world as opposed to a claim over purely temporal matters. This is an incomplete understanding, however, of the grounds on which its claim as a subject of international law can be justified", since, in his view, the Holy See's claim to international personality can also be justified  by the fact that it is recognized by other states as a full subject of international law. The Lateran Treaty itself seems to support this view. In article 2, Italy recognized "the sovereignty of the Holy See in the international domain as an attribute inherent in its nature, in accordance with its tradition and with the requirements of its mission in the world."

For a further group, the legal personality of the Holy See in international law arises from the Lateran Treaty, which, in their view, conferred international standing to the central government of the Catholic Church. In this sense, Oppenheim argued that "the previously controversial international position of the Holy See was clarified as the result of the Treaty of 11 February 1929, between the Holy See and Italy - the so called Lateran Treaty. (...) The Lateran Treaty marks the resumption of the formal membership, interrupted in 1871, of the Holy See in the society of states."

Oppenheim goes further and denies a separate legal personality for the Vatican City State. For him, the composite of the Holy See plus the Vatican City constitutes just one international person; see p. 328:

Kunz sharply criticized this view. For him:

Status between 1870 and 1929

A separate question is whether the Holy See was a subject of international law between 1870, when the Kingdom of Italy annexed the Papal States, and 1929, when the Lateran Treaties were signed. The United States, for instance, suspended diplomatic relations with the Holy See when it lost the Papal States. Similarly, Oppenheim believed that the legal personality of the Papal States became extinct in 1870. For him, between 1870 and 1929, the "Holy See was not an international person," although "it had by custom and tacit consent of most states acquired a quasi-international position". The United Nations International Law Commission noted, nonetheless, that:

Similarly, Kunz argued that:

Opposition to the Holy See's participation in multilateral forums
Since 1995, the non-governmental organization Catholics for Choice has advocated against the participation of the Holy See in multilateral forums. It argues that the Holy See is a religious organization and not a state, and that, therefore, it should have neither a special status in international law nor the right to participate, in a position analogous to that of states, in the international conferences on social, cultural and economic matters. No State has supported this initiative. On the contrary, the United Nations General Assembly confirmed and raised further the status of the Holy See as an observer within the UN, through its Resolution 58/314 of 16 July 2004.

See also
Holy See and the United Nations
Foreign relations of the Holy See
Multilateral foreign policy of the Holy See
Index of Vatican City-related articles

Bibliography
 Abdullah, Yasmin, “Note, The Holy See at United Nations Conferences: State or Church?” 96 Columbia Law Review 1835 (1996)
 Acquaviva, Guido, “Subjects of International Law: A Power-Based Analysis,” 38 Vanderbilt Journal of Transnational Law (2005)
 Arangio-Ruiz, Gaetano, “On the Nature of the International Personality of the Holy See,” 29 Revue Belge de Droit International (1996)
 Araujo, Robert and Lucal, John, Papal Diplomacy and the Quest for Peace, the Vatican and International Organizations from the early years to the League of Nations, Sapienza Press (2004)
 Araujo, Robert John, “The International Personality and Sovereignty of the Holy See,” 50 Catholic University Law Review 291 (2001)
 Bathon, Matthew N., Note, “The Atypical Status of the Holy See” 34 Vanderbilt Journal of Transnational Law 597 (2001)
 Ciprotti, Pio, “The Holy See: Its Function, Form, and Status in International Law,” 8 Concilium 63 (1970)
 Crawford, James, The Creation of States in International Law, Oxford, (1979)
 Cumbo, Horace F., “The Holy See and International Law,” 2 International Law Quarterly 603 (1949)
 Dias, Noel, “Roman Catholic Church and International Law,” 13 Sri Lanka Law Journal 107 (2001)
 Graham, Robert, Vatican Diplomacy: A Study of Church and State on the International Plane (1959)
 Ireland, Gordon, “The State of the City of the Vatican,” 27 American Journal of International Law 271 (1933).
 Kunz, Josef L., “The Status of the Holy See in International Law,” 46 American Journal of International Law 308 (1952)
 Martens, Kurt, “The Position of the Holy See and Vatican City State in International Relations,” 83 University of Detroit Mercy Law Review 729 (2006) 
 
 
 Wright, Herbert, “The Status of the Vatican City,” 38 American Journal of International Law 452 (1944)

References

External links
 Melanie Black, The Unusual Sovereign State: The Foreign Sovereign Immunities Act and Litigation Against the Holy See for Its Role in the Global Priest Sexual Abuse Scandal, Wisconsin International Law Journal, Volume 27
 O'Bryan v. Holy See (6th Cir., Sept. 17, 2007)

Holy See
International law
Foreign relations of the Holy See